Underbank Hall is a 16th-century town house in the centre of Stockport, Greater Manchester, England. The hall dates back to the 15th century and is a Grade II* listed building. It was home of the Arden family of Bredbury until 1823 when it was sold by William Arden, 2nd Baron Alvanley to pay off debts, and became a bank. A banking hall was then added to the rear in 1919. The hall is still used as a bank today and currently houses the NatWest branch for Stockport.

See also

Grade II* listed buildings in Greater Manchester
Listed buildings in Stockport

References

External links

Houses in Greater Manchester
Grade II* listed buildings in Greater Manchester
Buildings and structures in Stockport